Hans Gustaf Bo Berglund (24 February 1918 – 17 September 2006) was a Swedish sprint canoeist who competed from the late 1930s to the late 1940s. He won the gold in the K-2 1000 m event at the 1948 Summer Olympics in London.

Berglund also won two medals at the ICF Canoe Sprint World Championships with a gold (K-4 1000 m: 1948) and a silver (K-2 1000 m: 1938). Note that the K-4 1000 m event was not part of the Summer Olympics until the 1964 games in Tokyo. It was considered an extraordinary event and was part of the International Canoe Federation's 1948 world championships rather than the 1948 Games.

After retiring from competitions Berglund served as a technical expert for the International Canoe Federation at the 1956 and 1964 Olympics. His son Bo also became an Olympic canoeist.

References

External links
 
 

1918 births
2006 deaths
Canoeists at the 1948 Summer Olympics
Olympic canoeists of Sweden
Olympic gold medalists for Sweden
Swedish male canoeists
Olympic medalists in canoeing
ICF Canoe Sprint World Championships medalists in kayak
Medalists at the 1948 Summer Olympics
Sportspeople from Stockholm